The 1944 USC Trojans football team represented the University of Southern California (USC) in the 1944 college football season. In their third year under head coach Jeff Cravath, the Trojans compiled an 8–0–2 record (3–0–2 against conference opponents), won the Pacific Coast Conference championship, defeated Tennessee in the 1945 Rose Bowl, and outscored their opponents by a combined total of 240 to 73.

Schedule

References

USC
USC Trojans football seasons
Pac-12 Conference football champion seasons
Rose Bowl champion seasons
College football undefeated seasons
USC Trojans football